North Korea competed at the 2015 World Championships in Athletics in Beijing, China, from 22–30 August 2015 in two events: men and women's marathon.

Results

Men
Track and road events

Women
Track and road events

References

Nations at the 2015 World Championships in Athletics
World Championships in Athletics
North Korea at the World Championships in Athletics